The Two Edged Sword is a 1916 silent Vitagraph drama directed by George D. Baker. The film was written by Eugene V. Brewster and Lillian Case Russell, and it starred Edith Storey and Evart Overton.

Plot 
A bored married woman (Josephine Earle) tired of her workaholic novelist husband (Jed Brooks) embarks on a trip with her friend and meets a handsome farmer she begins a fling with. The farmer (Logan Paul) falls head over heels, but the woman doesn't take it seriously. When her husband pays a surprise visit to the farm, the farmer realizes he's been had, and after the husband beats him in a fight, he commits suicide. His enraged sister (Edith Storey) vows vengeance.

Cast 

 Edith Storey as Mary Brooks
 Evart Overton as Jed Brooks
 Josephine Earl as Dorothy Allen
 Robert Gaillard as Gordon Allen
 Logan Paul as Farmer Brooks

Production 
The film was shot in the fall of 1915.

References 

American silent films
1916 films
Vitagraph Studios films
1910s American films
1910s English-language films